Roseglen is an unincorporated community in northwestern McLean County, North Dakota, United States. It lies along North Dakota Highway 37 northwest of the city of Washburn, the county seat of McLean County. Its elevation is 2,100 feet (640 m). It has a post office with the ZIP code 58775. Roseglen Township is served by the White Shield School District, which operates a K-12 public school program from one campus in Roseglen.

References

External links
 Roseglen, North Dakota 58775
 White Shield School
 Golden jubilee, 1917-1967 :Roseglen, North Dakota, June 30, July 1-2,1967 from the Digital Horizons website

Unincorporated communities in McLean County, North Dakota
Unincorporated communities in North Dakota